Greatest Hits is a compilation album from DC Talk that include most of their chart-topping radio singles and fan favorites spanning the course of their career. The album is, for the most part, a re-release of their previous greatest hits album, Intermission: the Greatest Hits, but with the addition of "Godsend" and "Red Letters", and the subtraction of "Chance", "Sugar Coat It", "I Wish We'd All Been Ready", and the Mr. & Mrs. Morgan acts.

Track listing

References

DC Talk albums
2007 greatest hits albums
ForeFront Records compilation albums